William Reuben Applegarth (11 May 1890 – 5 December 1958) was a British track and field athlete, and winner of a gold medal in the 4 × 100 metres relay at the 1912 Summer Olympics.

Biography
Born in Guisborough, then in the North Riding of Yorkshire, William Applegarth was one of the best European sprinters during World War I.

At the Stockholm Olympics, Applegarth was eliminated in the semifinals of the 100 m competition and won a bronze medal in the 200 m. As the anchoring leg in the British 4 × 100 m relay team, he won a gold medal, in spite of finishing second after the US in the semifinal. The United States was later disqualified for a fault in passing the baton; the same mistake was made in the final by the world record holder and main favourite German team.

Shortly after the Olympics, Applegarth repeated Donald Lippincott's world record in the 100 m of 10.6 and set a new world record of 21.2 in the 200 m in the 1914 AAA meeting. His 200 m record was not broken until 1928.

In November 1914, Applegarth turned professional and in 1922 emigrated to America, where he became the track and association football coach at Mercersburg Academy in Pennsylvania. He also played for Brooklyn in the American Soccer League. In 1925 he retired from sport and began working as a welder at the General Electric Company, where he stayed until 1955. He died aged 68, in the same year that his British  record of 9.8 s was finally broken.

References

External links

profile

1890 births
1958 deaths
People from Guisborough
English footballers
English male sprinters
British male sprinters
Olympic athletes of Great Britain
Olympic gold medallists for Great Britain
Olympic bronze medallists for Great Britain
Athletes (track and field) at the 1912 Summer Olympics
English Olympic medallists
Medalists at the 1912 Summer Olympics
Olympic gold medalists in athletics (track and field)
Olympic bronze medalists in athletics (track and field)
English expatriate footballers
Expatriate soccer players in the United States
Brooklyn Wanderers players
American Soccer League (1921–1933) players
Association footballers not categorized by position
English expatriate sportspeople in the United States